German labour law refers to the regulation of employment relationships and industrial partnerships in Germany.

History
General Commission of German Trade Unions (1892–1919)
Free Association of German Trade Unions (1897–1919)
Weimar Constitution 1919
Betriebsrätegesetz 1920
Allgemeiner Deutscher Gewerkschaftsbund (1919–1933)
Free Workers' Union of Germany (1919–1933)
Arbeitsordnungsgesetz of 1934
German Labour Front, the nationalised Nazi controlled union (1933 to 1945)
Strength Through Joy
Council of Trust and Factory leader
Confederation of German Trade Unions (est 1949)
Mitbestimmungsgesetz 1976

Courts and constitution
Grundgesetz (1949) "Article 9 (Freedom of association). (1) All Germans have the right to form associations and societies. (2) Associations, the objects or activities of which conflict with the criminal laws or which are directed against the constitutional order or the concept of international understanding, are prohibited. (3) The right to form associations to safeguard and improve working and economic conditions is guaranteed to everyone and to all trades and professions. Agreements which restrict or seek to hinder this right are null and void; measures directed to this end are illegal."
Arbeitsgerichtsgesetz

Individual labour law

Contract of employment
Bürgerliches Gesetzbuch (Civil Code) §§ 611–630
Teilzeit- und Befristungsgesetz (Part-time and Fixed-term Work Act), §14(2) two-year fixed term limit
Arbeitnehmerüberlassungsgesetz (Employee Leasing Act)
Urlaubsgesetz (Holidays Act)
Mutterschutzgesetz (Act on Maternity Protection)
Arbeitszeitgesetz (Working Time Act)
Entgelttransparenzgesetz (Transparency in Wage Structures Act)

Dismissal
Kundigungsschutzgesetz (Dismissal Protection Act)

Collective labour law

Codetermination

Betriebsverfassungsgesetz (Works Constitution Act) requires establishment of Works Councils where there are five or more employees
Mitbestimmungsgesetz (Codetermination Act)

Collective bargaining
Tarifvertragsgesetz (Collective Agreement Act)

Minimum wage law

See also
German company law
German contract law
European labour law
United Kingdom labour law

Notes

References
Articles
A Freckmann, ‘Temporary Employment Business in Germany’ (2004) 15(1) International Company and Commercial Law Review 7
A Freckmann, ‘Termination of Employment Relationships in Germany – Still a Problem’ (2005) 16(1) International Company and Commercial Law Review 38
B Keller, ‘The Hartz Commission Recommendations and Beyond: An Intermediate Assessment’ (2003) 19(3) International Journal of Comparative Labour Law and Industrial Relations 363
O Kahn-Freund, ‘The Social Ideal of the Reich Labour Court - A Critical Examination of the Practice of the Reich Labour Court’ (1931)
S Konnert, ‘Unfair Dismissal by Reason of Redundancy in Germany’ (2005) 16(11) International Company and Commercial Law Review 431
E McGaughey, 'The Codetermination Bargains: The History of German Corporate and Labour Law' (2016) 23(1) Columbia Journal of European Law 135
B Waas, ‘Temporary Agency Work in Germany: Reflections on Recent Developments’ (2003) 19(3) International Journal of Comparative Labour Law and Industrial Relations 387

Books
M Weiss and M Schmidt, Labour Law and Industrial Relations in Germany (4th edn Kluwer 2008)
A Junker, Grundkurs Arbeitsrecht (3rd edn 2004)
O Kahn-Freund, R Lewis and J Clark (ed) Labour Law and Politics in the Weimar Republic (Social Science Research Council 1981) ch 3, 108-161
F Ebke and MW Finkin, Introduction to German Law (1996) ch 11, 305

External links
Erste Verordnung des Führers und Reichskanzlers über Wesen und Ziel der Deutschen Arbeitsfront vom 24. Oktober 1934